Elliponeura is a genus of grass flies in the family Chloropidae. There is at least one described species in Elliponeura, E. debilis.

References

Further reading

External links

 

Chloropinae
Chloropidae genera